Marcks is a surname. Notable people with the surname include:

 Erich Marcks (1891–1944), German general
 Gerhard Marcks (1889–1981), German sculptor
 Greg Marcks (born 1976), American director, writer and actor
 Megan Marcks (born 1972), Australian rower 
 Werner Marcks  (1896–1967), German general

See also 
 10778 Marcks, a main-belt asteroid
 Marks (disambiguation)
 Marks (surname)
 Marx (disambiguation)
 Marx (surname)

Surnames from given names